Gallardo v. Marstiller, 596 U.S. ___ (2022), was a United States Supreme Court case that held the Medicaid Act permits a state to seek reimbursement from settlement payments allocated for future medical care. The case was brought by the parents of Gianinna Gallardo, who was in a persistent vegetative state.

References

External links 
 

2022 in United States case law
United States Supreme Court cases
United States Supreme Court cases of the Roberts Court
United States statutory interpretation case law